Omonia Aradippou is a Cypriot professional football club based in Aradippou, a settlement on the outskirts of the city of Larnaca. The club was founded on 4 April 1929 and currently, they compete in the Cypriot Second Division. They have competed in the Cypriot First Division several times in the past. The 1995–1996 season is their most recent one in the First Division. Omonia plays their home games at the Municipal Aradippou stadium. Omonia has a long-standing rivalry with their neighbouring club Ermis.

Current squad

Technical staff

Achievements
Cypriot Second Division Winners: 2
 1977–1978, 1992–1993

References

External links
 Official club website

 
Football clubs in Cyprus
Association football clubs established in 1929
1929 establishments in Cyprus
Football clubs in Larnaca